Addai or Addae is a surname of Ashanti origin. Notable people with this surname include:

 Alex Addai (born 1993), English footballer
 Bright Addae (born 1992), Ghanaian footballer
 Catherine Addai, Ghanaian-Canadian fashion designer
 Cynthia Addai-Robinson (born 1985), American actress
 Jeff Addai (born 1993), Canadian soccer player
 Joseph Addai (born 1983), American football player
 Kwame Addae, Ghanaian diplomat
 Levi David Addai (born 1983), British playwright
Richard Addai (born 1986), Ghanaian footballer
Richard Addai (born 1991), Ghanaian footballer

References 

Surnames of Ashanti origin
Surnames of Akan origin